The Jamhoori Wattan Party is a political party in Balochistan, Pakistan.

The party has split into two factions, with the non-dominant one led by Baramdagh Bugti splitting off to form the Baloch Republican Party.

Electoral history
In legislative elections, held on 20 October 2002, the party won 0.3% of the popular vote and 1 out of 272 elected members.

National Assembly

See also 
 Nawab Akbar Khan Bugti
 Balochistan National Party (Awami)
 Balochistan National Party (Mengal)
 Baloch Council of North America

Further reading

References 

Baloch nationalist organizations
Republicanism in Pakistan
Political parties in Pakistan